Boralesgamuwa is a city on the Colombo-Horana Road about  south-east of the commercial capital Colombo. The Boralesgamuwa junction was formerly known as Nagass Handiya.

One of Sri Lanka's largest kaolin deposits is in Boralesgamuwa. The Bellanwila Rajamaha Viharaya is very close to the Boralesgamuwa.

The post code of Boralesgamuwa is 10290.

Nearby places
 General Sir John Kotelawala Defence University Hospital
 Boralesgamuwa Wawa is a lake along the Maharagama–Boralesgamuwa Road.
 Attidiya Bird Sanctuary is the natural sanctuary closest to Colombo.
 Weras Ganga Park

Maps
Detailed map of Boralesgamuwa vicinity and Sri Lanka

References

Populated places in Western Province, Sri Lanka